Legislative elections were held in Israel on 23 March 2021 to elect the 120 members of the 24th Knesset. It was the fourth Knesset election in two years, amidst the continued political deadlock following the previous three elections in April 2019, September 2019 and 2020. Yair Lapid and Naftali Bennett announced that they had formed a rotation government on 2 June 2021, which was approved on 13 June 2021.

Background

According to the coalition agreement signed between Likud and Blue and White in 2020, elections were to be held 36 months after the swearing-in of the 35th government, making 23 May 2023 the last possible election date. However, Israeli law stipulates that if the 2020 state budget was not passed by 23 December 2020, the Knesset would be dissolved, and elections would be held by 23 March 2021.

On 2 December 2020, the Knesset passed the preliminary reading of a bill to dissolve the current government by a vote of 61–54. On 21 December 2020, the Knesset failed to pass a bill to avoid dispersal by a vote of 47–49. Since the Knesset had failed to approve the 2020 state budget by the required deadline, at midnight IST on 23 December 2020, the government coalition collapsed, and the 23rd Knesset was officially dissolved. In accordance with the law that the election must be held within 90 days after the dissolution of the Knesset, the date for elections to the 24th Knesset was automatically set for 23 March 2021. Netanyahu was reported as facing a strong challenge from opposition parties.

Electoral system

The 120 seats in the Knesset were elected by closed list proportional representation in a single nationwide constituency. The electoral threshold for this election was 3.25%.

Surplus-vote agreements 

Two parties could sign a surplus vote agreement that allowed them to compete for leftover seats as if they were running together on the same list. The Bader–Ofer method slightly favours larger lists, meaning that alliances are more likely to receive leftover seats than parties would be individually. If the alliance receives leftover seats, the Bader–Ofer calculation is applied privately, to determine how the seats are divided among the two allied lists.

The following lists signed surplus vote-sharing agreements for the 2021 election:
 Yamina and New Hope
Yesh Atid and Yisrael Beiteinu
Blue and White and New Economic Party
Likud and Religious Zionism
 Israeli Labor Party and Meretz
 Shas and United Torah Judaism

Leadership elections and primaries
Leadership elections were held by some parties to determine party leadership ahead of the election. Primary elections were held by some parties in advance of the national election to determine the composition of their party list.

Balad
Knesset MK Sami Abu Shehadeh announced on 14 January 2021 that he would run for the leadership of Balad. MK and former leader Mtanes Shehadeh sought re-election. The party held primaries on 23 January 2021 for its leader and its list for Knesset. The Balad council, which consists of a total of 600 members, were eligible to vote in Nazareth. Abu Shehadeh was elected party leader by the Central Committee, with a total of 230 votes.

Green Party
Stav Shaffir was re-elected as the head of Green Party on 29 January 2021.

Jewish Home

On 5 January, incumbent Jewish Home party leader Rafi Peretz stated that he would not head the party and would not stand for re-election, but did not rule out a return to politics in the future. Nir Orbach announced he would run for the leadership slot. Hagit Moshe also ran (at Netanyahu's request). The party's Central Committee selected its chair and party list, rather than holding a vote amongst party members. Moshe was elected party leader by the Central Committee on 19 January 2021. Party primaries were held on 26 January.

Labor

The Tel Aviv District Court ruled on 3 January 2021 that primaries for Labor's Knesset list and leadership must take place, despite the fact that Amir Peretz and his supporters voted in favor of canceling them. MK Merav Michaeli announced she would run for party leadership shortly after. Gil Beilin announced he would run on 11 January. The Israeli High Court rejected an appeal by the Labor party, ensuring that all party members (instead of just committee members) will be able to vote in the primary. Former Labor leader Ehud Barak announced on 18 January that he would not run, while Itzik Shmuli announced the next day that he would not run. Avi Shaked and David Landsman, Ethiopian immigrant Yitzhak Time, and Na'ava Katz also ran.

The vote for party leader was won by Michaeli on 24 January.

The deadline for entering the Knesset primary was extended to 30 January; 59 candidates entered the race. The primary election for choosing the Knesset slate took place 1 February.

Likud
The Likud was ordered by its internal court to have its Constitutional Committee meet by 30 December to begin preparations for the selection of candidates for its electoral slate, following a petition filed by members of the party's Central Committee. The party's Constitution Committee voted on 30 December to cancel party primaries, which was made official on 2 January 2021.

Meretz
Meretz would have held a leadership election on 13 January 2021, while a primary for the rest of its electoral list would have been held on 21 January. However, the party decided on 3 January 2021 to not hold primaries as no one challenged Nitzan Horowitz, the party leader.

Parties

Parliamentary factions 
At the end of the 23rd Knesset, there were thirteen factions in parliament. The parties of these parliamentary factions are all fielding lists to compete in the 2021 elections, or are members of such lists, with the exception of The Jewish Home.

Contesting parties 

A total of 39 parties registered to contest the elections.

Public expression of interest
The following parties, which did not have representation in the Knesset prior to the election, expressed interest in participating in the 2021 election, but ultimately chose not to contest it:

Or HaShahar, founded by former Labor MK and Haifa mayor Yona Yahav
Unity Party, founded by former Labor MK Michael Bar-Zohar

Not running
The Israelis, a party founded by Tel Aviv mayor Ron Huldai, dropped out of the race on 4 February 2021. 
 The Israeli Veterans Party dropped out of the race on 3 February 2021 and has endorsed Yesh Atid.
 The Jewish Home dropped out of the race on 4 February 2021 and has endorsed Yamina.
 Telem dropped out of the race on 1 February 2021.
Tnufa, a party founded by former Yesh Atid MK Ofer Shelah, dropped out of the race on 4 February 2021.
 Zehut announced on 24 December 2020 that the party would not run in the election.

Opinion polls

Newspaper endorsements
The daily Haaretz endorsed four parties in the 2021 election: Meretz, the Joint List, Labor, and Yesh Atid.

Results

Members of the Knesset who lost their seats

Government formation

Israeli President Reuven Rivlin met with the heads of all political parties on 5 April, and charged Benjamin Netanyahu with forming the government the next day. Netanyahu had been given until the end of 4 May to form a government. Netanyahu failed to form a new government by the deadline. The next day, Rivlin entrusted Yair Lapid with the second mandate. On 9 May 2021, it was reported that Lapid and Naftali Bennett had made major headway in the coalition talks. On 10 May, it was reported that plans were made to form a new government consisting of the current opposition, but that the Islamist Ra'am Party, which froze talks with both Lapid and Bennett in the wake of recent warfare in Gaza, still needed to pledge support for the Change bloc for the opposition MKs to secure a majority. In late May, Lapid secured the support from Blue and White, Labor Party, Yisrael Beiteinu, New Hope, and Meretz, with Yamina and Ra'am possibly giving support. On 30 May 2021, Bennett announced in a televised address that Yamina would join a unity government with Lapid, after all but one Yamina MK agreed to back this decision.

On 2 June 2021, following negotiations with Lapid and Bennett, Ra'am leader Mansour Abbas officially signed a coalition agreement with Lapid, and agreed to allow his party to join a non-Netanyahu government. Just an hour before his 2 June mandate was set to expire, Lapid informed outgoing president Reuven Rivlin that he could form a new government. On 11 June 2021, Bennett's Yamina party became the last opposition faction to sign a coalition agreement with Lapid's Yesh Atid party, thus allowing the thirty-sixth government of Israel to be sworn in on 13 June. Bennett became prime minister with Lapid as alternate prime minister, intended to take over as head of government in 2023.

See also 
2021 in Israel
2021 Israeli presidential election
List of elections in 2021
List of members of the twenty-fourth Knesset

Notes

References

External links

 Elections for the 24th Knesset. Central Elections Committee

Legislative
Legislative elections in Israel
Israel
Benjamin Netanyahu
Naftali Bennett